Sunseeker International is a British luxury performance motor yacht brand. Originally named Poole Power Boats, the company was founded by brothers Robert and John Braithwaite in 1969. The company changed its name to Sunseeker International in 1985 and has since become a global icon. Its headquarters and main assembly facility is in Poole Harbour, at Poole in Dorset, England. The majority shareholder has been Wanda Group since 2013. It is the largest UK-based luxury yacht maker measured by 2012 revenues.

Profile

Corporate information
The main operating company's (Sunseeker International Limited, company number 00675320) registered office is Sunseeker House, West Quay Road, Poole, Dorset, BH15 1JD. Sunseeker describes the nature of its business using the Standard Industrial Classification number 30110: 'Building of ships and floating structures'.

A holding company, Sunseeker International (Holdings) Limited, was founded in 2006 using an off-the-shelf company. There are other companies in the group, including specialist entities for chartering and mouldings manufacturing.

Debt financing is provided to the group by HSBC Bank plc through a revolving credit facility agreement originally dated 8 July 2015, as subsequently amended and restated, pursuant to which the group has mortgaged and charged various assets, including (inter alios) its shipyards, intellectual property, and goodwill.

Industrial profile
Manufacturing is undertaken mainly in Poole, in seven production plants and shipyards where it employs c. 2,600 people and produces around 150 boats every year ranging from 38–161 feet. An additional deep-water shipyard is used to build the 105 yacht and larger vessels. In March 2007, the company announced a 500 job expansion program, with a new site on the Isle of Portland,

Poole is also home to Sunseeker's dedicated Design & Technology Centre, a unique facility which vertically integrates every detail of the yachts from the initial concept designs through to the finishing details including furniture, complex electrical systems, helm consoles and soft furnishings. As Sunseeker produces these components in its own dedicated facility, it is able to offer exceptionally high quality control, craftmanship and attention to detail.

History
In October 2002, Robert Braithwaite, the founder of Sunseeker International, was named Ernst & Young's UK Entrepreneur of the Year.

In 2006 Robert Braithwaite led a £44 million MBO of the company, backed by Bank of Scotland.

The company features in the 2008 Sunday Times list Profit Track 100 of the most profitable non-listed companies and in the Top Track 250 list of mid-sized non-listed companies.

In 2010, Irish private equity firm FL Partners took over ownership of Sunseeker through a debt restructuring deal after Sunseeker posted losses the previous year.

On 19 June 2013 it was announced that the Chinese conglomerate Dalian Wanda Group had agreed to buy a 91.8% stake in Sunseeker for £320M. As reported, it has been promised that the day-to-day running of Sunseeker in Poole will be unaffected, with its 2,500-strong workforce keeping their jobs. The deal is set to be sealed by mid-August.

In January 2015, Phil Popham was appointed as the company's new Chief Executive Officer.

In June 2019, Sunseeker announced that Andrea Frabetti, formerly Chief Technical Officer at Sunseeker, replaced Christian Marti as CEO. Prior to his time at Sunseeker, Frabetti worked at Italian superyacht manufacturer Ferretti Group for over 25 years, including time as vice president of product development, as well as at Diesel Center SPA as CEO. Marti came on board as Sunseeker’s CEO in November 2018 following the departure of Phil Popham.

Appearance in popular culture 
Sunseeker boats have featured in the James Bond film series since The World Is Not Enough (1999), chasing up the Thames in the pre-credits sequence, and continued through Die Another Day (2002), Casino Royale (2006) and Quantum of Solace (2008). This latest outing showed Sunseeker's new 37m Yacht and the Superhawk 43; it also featured a cameo role for Sunseeker's then managing director, Robert Braithwaite, in one of Sunseeker's very first open-cockpit speedboats, the Sovereign 17.

A BBC Two documentary about the brand, Britain's Biggest Superyachts: Chasing Perfection, shows the building of the Sunseeker 131 yacht.

In the feature film Logan, James (Wolverine) is shown trying to secure money to buy a Sunseeker and live with Charles Xavier and Caliban on the ocean.

See also
Fairline Boats
Princess Yachts

References

External links

2013 mergers and acquisitions
Companies based in Poole
Yacht building companies
British companies established in 1969
Vehicle manufacturing companies established in 1969
1969 establishments in England
Shipbuilding companies of England
Dalian Wanda Group
British subsidiaries of foreign companies